HMS Swiftsure was a 42-gun great ship of the English Royal Navy, built by Andrew Burrell at Deptford and launched in 1621.

She was rebuilt in 1654 at Woolwich by Christopher Pett as a 60-gun third rate ship of the line. She was the flagship of Vice-Admiral Sir William Berkeley at the Four Days' Battle against the Dutch in 1666. Berkeley led the van of the English fleet on the first day of the battle, 1 June, but outsailed his squadron into the midst of the Dutch, and was surrounded. After a fierce battle in which Berkeley was killed, Swiftsure was captured. The Dutch renamed her the Oudshoorn (70 cannon) and changed the quartergalleries to hide her identity. She fought in the Battle of Solebay in 1672 under the command of Thomas Tobias.

Notes

References

Lavery, Brian (2003) The Ship of the Line - Volume 1: The development of the battlefleet 1650-1850. Conway Maritime Press. .

Ships of the line of the Royal Navy
Ships of the line of the Dutch Republic
Ships built in Deptford
1620s ships
Captured ships